Hesham Hanafy (born 12 August 1973) is an Egyptian former footballer. He was a member of the Egypt national football team during his rise at Al-Ahly. Hanafy made several appearances for the Egypt national football team, including 1998 FIFA World Cup qualifying matches.

International Goals

Scores and results list Egypt's goal tally first.

External links

References

Egyptian footballers
Egypt international footballers
Al Ahly SC players
1973 births
Living people
Egyptian Premier League players
Association football midfielders